Gabriel Rodrigues de Moura (born 18 June 1988) is a Brazilian professional footballer who plays as a right-back for Romanian Liga II side Dinamo București.

Club career

Sepsi OSK Sfântu Gheorghe
Moura arrived in Romania in 2018, when he signed a contract with Sepsi OSK.

Dinamo București
On 26 June 2019, he moved to Dinamo București, following his manager from Sepsi OSK, Eugen Neagoe. He made his debut for the team on 15 July 2019, playing for 90 minutes in a 5-0 loss against Viitorul Constanta. After Eugen Neagoe was sacked and replaced by Dušan Uhrin Jr., he lost his place in the first squad. Moura featured sparingly in the 2019-2020 first part of the season, often being played outside his favorite position, as a left back or even as a left winger. From this position, he produced his first assist for the club, for a goal scored by Ricardo Grigore in a 4-1 win against Chindia Târgoviște.

Gaz Metan Mediaș
After only six months, Moura left Dinamo on 25 January 2020 and reached an agreement with another Romanian club, Gaz Metan Mediaș.

Dinamo București
Following major financial problems at Gaz Metan Mediaș, he returned to Dinamo București on 14 February 2022. He played regularly as a right back in an underachieving Dinamo București team, under both Flavius Stoican and Dušan Uhrin Jr. Playing as a left back, on 1 April 2022, Moura produced an assist for Vlad Morar in a 2-0 win against Chindia Târgoviște. He made 10 appearances for Dinamo București in Liga I in the 2021-2022 season. He also played for 90 minutes in the first leg of the play-out game against Universitatea Cluj, which Dinamo București lost and relegated for the first time in history.

For the 2022-2023, Moura was one of the few experienced players who stayed at the club to play in the Liga II, playing regularly under manager Ovidiu Burcă. On 16 August 2022, he assisted Vasile Buhăescu in a 3-1 loss against Oțelul Galați.

References

External links
 
 

1988 births
Living people
Brazilian footballers
Brazilian expatriate footballers
Association football defenders
Guarany Futebol Clube players
F.C. Penafiel players
Gil Vicente F.C. players
Anorthosis Famagusta F.C. players
Sepsi OSK Sfântu Gheorghe players
FC Dinamo București players
CS Gaz Metan Mediaș players
Primeira Liga players
Segunda Divisão players
Liga Portugal 2 players
Cypriot First Division players
Liga I players
Liga II players
Expatriate footballers in Portugal
Brazilian expatriate sportspeople in Portugal
Expatriate footballers in Cyprus
Brazilian expatriate sportspeople in Cyprus
Expatriate footballers in Romania
Brazilian expatriate sportspeople in Romania